Clifford Marshall Grainge (21 July 1927 – 26 May 1989) was an English first-class cricketer and educator.

Grainge was born in July 1927 at Heckmondwike, Yorkshire. He later studied at Keble College, Oxford where he played first-class cricket for Oxford University. He made his debut against Lancashire at Oxford in 1950, with Grainge playing first-class cricket for Oxford until 1952, making a total of fourteen appearances. Playing as a right-arm fast-medium bowler, he took 25 wickets at an average of 43.60. He took one five wicket haul, figures of 5 for 127 which came against Surrey in 1951. He was a poor tailend batsman, scoring just 47 runs at an average of 5.22. 

After graduating from Oxford, he became a schoolteacher. His first teaching position was in Norfolk at Langley School, before taking up a post teaching geography at Leeds Grammar School. Late in his teaching career in 1984 he suffered a leg amputation, prior to retiring in July 1987. Grainge died at Leeds in May 1989.

References

External links

1927 births
1989 deaths
People from Heckmondwike
Alumni of Keble College, Oxford
English cricketers
Oxford University cricketers
Schoolteachers from Norfolk
English amputees
Schoolteachers from Yorkshire